The war guilt question is the public debate that took place in Germany for the most part during the Weimar Republic, to establish Germany's share of responsibility in the causes of the First World War. Structured in several phases, and largely determined by the impact of the Treaty of Versailles and the attitude of the victorious Allies, this debate also took place in other countries involved in the conflict, such as in the French Third Republic and the United Kingdom.

The war guilt debate motivated historians such as Hans Delbrück, Wolfgang J. Mommsen, Gerhard Hirschfeld, and Fritz Fischer, but also a much wider circle including intellectuals such as Kurt Tucholsky and Siegfried Jacobsohn, as well as the general public. The war guilt question pervaded the history of the Weimar Republic. Founded shortly before the signing of the Treaty of Versailles in June 1919, Weimar embodied this debate until its demise, after which it was subsequently taken up as a campaign argument by the Nazi Party.

While the war guilt question made it possible to investigate the deep-rooted causes of the First World War, although not without provoking a great deal of controversy, it also made it possible to identify other aspects of the conflict, such as the role of the masses and the question of Germany's special path to democracy, the Sonderweg. This debate, which obstructed German political progress for many years, also showed that politicians such as Gustav Stresemann were able to confront the war guilt question by advancing the general discussion without compromising German interests.

A century later, debate continues into the 21st century. The main outlines of the debate include: how much diplomatic and political room to maneuver was available; the inevitable consequences of pre-war armament policies; the role of domestic policy and social and economic tensions in the foreign relations of the states involved; the role of public opinion and their experience of war in the face of organized propaganda; the role of economic interests and top military commanders in torpedoing deescalation and peace negotiations; the  theory; and the long-term trends which tend to contextualize the First World War as a condition or preparation for the Second, such as Raymond Aron who views the two world wars as the new Thirty Years' War, a theory reprised by Enzo Traverso in his work.

Terminology 

Article 231 of the Treaty of Versailles is at the heart of the issue; also known as the "War Guilt Clause", article 231 delineated German responsibility for the war.

Additional terms are seen in English sources, such as war guilt thesis, Versailles war guilt thesis, and others.

Background: World War I 

The question of German war guilt took place in the context of the German defeat by the Allied Powers in World War I, during and after the treaties that established the peace, and continuing on throughout the fifteen-year life of the Weimar Republic in Germany from 1919 to 1933, and beyond.

Outbreak of war 

Hostilities in World War I took place mostly in Europe between 1914 and 11 November 1918, and involved mobilization of 70 million military personnel and resulted in over 20 million military and civilian deaths (exclusive of fatalities from the 1918 Spanish flu pandemic, which accounted for millions more) making it one of the largest and deadliest wars in history. By July 1914, the great powers of Europe were divided into two coalitions: the Triple Entente, later called the "Allied Powers", consisting of France, Russia, and Britain; and the Triple Alliance of Germany, Austria-Hungary, and Italy (the "Central Powers"). After a series of events, ultimatums, and mobilizations, some of them due to interlocking alliances, Germany declared war on Russia on 1 August. Within days the other powers followed suit, and before the end of the month the war extended to Japan (siding with Britain) and in November, to the Ottoman Empire (with Germany).

After four years of war on multiple fronts in Europe and around the world, an Allied offensive began in August 1918, and the position of Germany and the Central Powers deteriorated, leading them to sue for peace. Initial offers were rejected, and Germany's position became more desperate. Awareness of impending military defeat sparked revolution in Germany, proclamation of a republic on 9 November 1918, the abdication of Kaiser Wilhelm II, and German surrender, marking the end of Imperial Germany and the beginning of the Weimar Republic. The Central Powers collapsed, with the new Republic capitulating to the victorious Allies and ending hostilities by signing the Armistice of 11 November 1918 in a railroad car.

Concluding peace 

Though hostilities ended on 11 November, a formal state of war continued for months and various treaties were signed amongst the former belligerents. The Paris Peace Conference set terms for the defeated Central Powers, created the League of Nations, rewrote the map of Europe, and under the terms of Article 231 of the Treaty of Versailles, imposed financial penalties in which Germany had to pay reparations of 132 billion gold marks (US$33 billion) to the Allied Powers. In addition, Article 231 stated that "Germany accepts responsibility of Germany and her allies causing all the loss and damage..." but was mistranslated or interpreted in Germany as an admission by Germany of responsibility for causing the war. This, plus the heavy burden of reparations was taken as an injustice and national humiliation, and that Germany had signed "away her honor".

Innocence campaign 

This sense of an unjust and excessive financial burden imposed by the victorious Allied Powers based on a misplaced accusation of blame for having caused the war caused resentment and anger in Germany and resulted in vigorous efforts on multiple fronts to oppose it, including diplomatic, propagandistic, and others. These efforts to deal with the war guilt question began during treaty negotiations in Paris, continued throughout the life of the Weimar Republic, and contributed to the rise of the NSDAP (Nazi) Party—which seized power in 1933, bringing the Weimar Republic to an end—and to 1939 and the outbreak of World War II.

In the Weimar Republic

Treaty of Versailles

Overview and Treaty clauses 

The four great powers led by Woodrow Wilson for the Americans, Georges Clemenceau for the French, David Lloyd George for the British and Vittorio Emanuele Orlando for the Italians met to prepare the peace treaty. Rather than sticking to Wilson's 14 Points, the European vision quickly took hold. Decisions were made without Germany, which was excluded from the debates. France, which had served as the main battleground, wanted to ensure a peace of revenge through Clemenceau: "The time has come for a heavy settling of scores".
The Treaty of Versailles was above all a "treaty of fear": each former enemy tried to protect his own country. Moreover, the Allies still behaved like enemies when they presented the peace conditions to the German delegation, which finally was invited to attend on 7 May 1919.  The deadline for ratification was in fifteen days; after that, military operations could resume.

War Guilt Clause as the basis for reparations 

Article 231 of the Treaty states:

The treaty assigned the role of aggressor in World War I to Germany and her allies alone. It meant an initial isolation of Germany, which saw itself as the scapegoat for the misdeeds of the other European states before the World War.

The one-sided apportionment of blame to Germany triggered a national debate. The signatures by Hermann Müller and Johannes Bell, who had come to office through the Weimar National Assembly in 1919, fed the stab-in-the-back myth propagated primarily by Paul von Hindenburg and Erich Ludendorff and later by Adolf Hitler.

Historians today take a more nuanced view of the causes of World War I than is expressed in the treaty. Article 231 was not intended to evaluate historical events, but to legally and morally legitimize the peace terms that were disadvantageous to the German Reich. Moreover, the German Empire was to be held financially liable for the damage to land and people that the German imperial troops had caused, especially in France. The Treaty of Versailles therefore laid the groundwork for the reparation claims against the German Reich, in an amount which was not initially determined. The representatives of the German Empire therefore protested Article 231 not merely for reasons of self-justification, but with the aim of undermining the moral basis of the enemy's demands as a whole. The reparations burdened the new republican state; they were one of several causes of the hyperinflation of 1921 to 1923.

Impact in Germany 

Before the treaty was signed on June 28, 1919, the government of the Reich was already talking about an upheaval. 
President Friedrich Ebert spoke on 6 February 1919 upon the opening of the Reichstag, of "revenge and plans for rape".
Germany was stunned by the terms of the treaty. The government claimed it was a ploy to dishonor the German people. The impact of the treaty was first and foremost moral. The moral punishment was a heavier burden to bear than the material one. Treaty clauses that reduced territory, the economy, and sovereignty were seen as a means of making Germany morally grovel. Article 231, the so-called "War Guilt Clause", put the responsibility for the war on Germany.

For Foreign Minister Brockdorff-Rantzau, recognition of Germany as having sole culpability was a lie.  He resigned in June 1919 to avoid having to sign the treaty, which bore the seeds of its own rebuttal. Brockdorff-Rantzau had moreover said before the Allies at Versailles: "But also in the manner of waging war, Germany wasn't the only one to make mistakes, each nation made them. I do not wish to respond to accusations with accusations, but if we are asked to make amends, we must not forget the armistice."
The violence with which the treaty was imposed forced the Germans to refute it. By its nature, the treaty deprived the Weimar Republic of any historical confrontation with its own history. The thesis of responsibility derived its strength from the fact that for the first time, a country's responsibility had been officially established.

Reactions

Calls for an International tribunal 

While representatives of the Independent Social Democratic and the Communist parties tended to emphasize the moral war guilt of the imperial leaders and associated it with social rather than legal consequences, the provisional government in Berlin in early 1919 called for a "neutral" international court to exclude the question of war guilt from the upcoming Paris peace negotiations.

It attempted to clarify the question of guilt scientifically, and wanted to have the degree of culpability and violations of international law examined by an arbitration court. It combined this with criticism of the policy of the Entente powers toward Germany and fought their alleged "war guilt lie" even before the Treaty of Versailles was signed. A four-member delegation of the Association was to reject the Allied theories of war guilt on behalf of the Foreign Office and, to this end, handed over a "Memorandum on the Examination of the War Guilt Question" (also called the "Professorial Memorandum") in Versailles.

After the Allies rejected the proposals and demanded instead the extradition of the "war-culpable individuals", Otto Landsknecht (MSPD Bavaria) called for a national state tribunal on 12 March 1919, to try them. This was supported by only a few SPD representatives, including Philipp Scheidemann. As a result, ex-general Erich Ludendorff attacked him violently and accused the government representatives of treason in the sense of the stab in the back myth. After the conditions of Versailles became known, they demanded the deletion of the paragraph on the extradition of the "war-guilty".

Landsberg project 

On March 12, 1919, Minister of Justice Otto Landsberg proposed a bill to establish an international tribunal to analyze events before and during the war. This bill originated in a proposal made by the Secretary of State for Foreign Affairs Wilhelm Solf on 29 November 1918. For Solf, the creation of a neutral commission was the only way to bring international peace, to create lasting guarantees against possible wars, and to restore the confidence of the people.

Solf's proposal was based on the analysis of the political situation and the negotiations between the powers in July 1914 and the positions taken by their respective governments.  Solf laid the foundations for a neutral scientific research that should eventually provide a "complete and faithful picture of reality". For this reason, he proposed to publish all the acts of the powers involved in the war, even going so far as wishing to question the personalities who determined the history of their own countries at the time of the outbreak of war as well as any witnesses having important evidence. Few social-democratic representatives supported the project, one exception being Philipp Scheidemann. The Landsberg project was rejected by the Allies, who demanded that the major German war criminals be handed over to them, and abandoned this idea in 1922.

Propaganda response 

At the beginning of World War I, all of the main combatants published bound versions of diplomatic correspondence, with greater or lesser accuracy, partly for domestic consumption and also partly to influence other actors about the responsibility for the war. The German White Book was the first of these to appear, and was published in 1914, with numerous other color books appearing shortly thereafter by each of the major powers.

After the conclusion of the war and the draconian aspects of the Treaty of Versailles, Germany launched various propaganda efforts to counter the imputation of guilt upon Germany by the victorious Allies, starting with the War Guilt Section, run by the Foreign Ministry. Two additional units were created in April 1921, in an effort to appear to be independent of the ministry: the Center for the Study of the Causes of the War, and the Working Committee of German Associations .

In addition, the Weimar National Assembly established an inquiry into guilt for the war on 20 August 1919. Its four subcommittees were tasked with examining the causes of the war, what brought about its loss, what missed opportunities for peace had presented themselves, and if international laws had been broken. The inquiry continued for thirteen years, until the Nazi Party victory in the election of July 1932. The inquiry's findings were hampered by lack of cooperation from both the government and the military and were in general watered down and deflected blame away from Germany.

War Guilt Section 

The position of the SPD party majority, which was tied to its own approval of the war from 1914 to 1918 and left the imperial administrative apparatus almost untouched, continued to determine the domestic political reappraisal of the war.
With an eye to the Paris Peace Conference (1919–1920), that began on January 18, 1919, by late 1918 the Foreign Office had already established the "Bülow Special Office", named after former Reich Chancellor Bernhard von Bülow and which had been set up after the armistice. Its role was to collect documents from various sources, including the Bolsheviks, for use by to counter the Allied allegations at Versailles. The documents collected by the Special Bureau were used in German negotiations in Paris, as part of the "Professors' Memorandum" presented to the allies on 27 May 1919. It was probably written by von Bülow, but signed by the professors for "patriotic reasons".
In 1919, this became the "War Guilt Section", and its purpose was to counter the war guilt accusation of the Allies.

In the same way that color books did, the Office collected documents to counter accusations that Germany and Austria-Hungary had planned the world war and had "intentionally" disregarded the international law of war. This was also intended to provide foreign historians and journalists with exculpatory  material to influence public opinion abroad.

The department also acted as an "internal censorship office", determined which publications were to be praised or criticized, and prepared official statements for the Reich Chancellor on the subject of war guilt.
Theodor Schieder later wrote about this: "In its origin, the research was virtually a continuation of the war by other means."

However, documentation from the War Guilt Section was not considered by the delegates of the victorious powers at the Paris Conference or in the years that followed. The only concession from the Allies, was waiving their demand for extradition of the German "main war criminals" after 1922.

Center for the Study of the Causes of the War 

The Center for the Study of the Causes of the War  was a "clearinghouse for officially desirable views on the outbreak of the war" and for circulating these views faster and more broadly. The center was created by the War Guilt Section in order to bring to the public documents which would unify public opinion towards the official line. It was prolific, with Wegerer writing more than 300 articles.

Working Committee of German Associations 

The Working Committee of German Associations was an umbrella organization founded in 1921 by the German Foreign Ministry, as part of an attempt to gain control over German patriotic organizations which were calling for a revision of the Treaty of Versailles and its war guilt clause. It had a board of directors and a business office under Dr. Hans Draeger, and had about 2,000 member organizations in the 1920s.

Its mission was to forge a uniform public opinion about the war by moderating extreme protestations of innocence on the right, and of acquiescence in accusations of guilt on the left.  In practice, this amounted to silencing those admitting any guilt on the part of Germany, with the intent of strengthening German resolve at home to seek revision of the treaty.

To further this aim, the Committee held seminars, conducted special workshops for the press, unions, and liaison personnel; and held exhibitions, conventions, and rallies.  The Committee exploited and distributed the War Guilt Section's documentary collections, and circulated works of foreign revisionists from the United States and Britain.  They did not solely address the question of war guilt, but also of reparations, armaments, colonies, the Rhineland issue, minorities, the League of Nations, through guides, pamphlets, and broadsides. They used works of foreign revisionists to strengthen the case for exculpation at home, while striving to maintain a united front at home in order to influence revisionists abroad, such as the American Harry Elmer Barnes.

Dealing with the issue and responsibilities

Potsdam Reichsarchiv 

From 1914 on, the German army exerted a great influence on German historiography. The General Staff was responsible for writing war reports until 1918, when the Potsdam , founded by Hans von Seeckt, took over. The Foreign Office conducted the historiography of the Weimar Republic in parallel with the Reichswehr and its administrative staff, who were largely opposed to democracy.

The  also worked to refute German responsibility for the war, and for war crimes. To this end, it produced technical reports for the parliamentary commission and published eighteen volumes on the subject of "The First World War 1914–1918" from 1925 until it was taken over by the German Federal Archives in 1956. Until 1933, the methods of historical criticism used were:
 methodical interrogation of witnesses and analysis of reports from subordinate military services where collections of military mail become new historical sources.
 Some of the criticism of the Supreme Army Command, especially against Helmuth von Moltke and Erich von Falkenhayn, was officially admitted, which relieved their successors, Hindenburg and Ludendorff, of their responsibility.
 The primacy of government policy and the traditional German attraction to "great leaders" contradicts, in part unintentionally, the logic of the legend which arose from fateful forces, of non-responsibility for the war.

Nevertheless, some aspects  remain to be studied, such as the influence of the economy, the masses, or ideology, on the course of the war. The evolution towards a "total war" is a concept that is still unknown.

Acknowledging the question 

While most of the German media denounced the treaty, others believed that the question of responsibility for the war should be dealt with at a moral level. One example was Die Weltbühne ("World Stage"), a left-liberal journal founded in November 1918. According to its editor, Siegfried Jacobsohn, it is absolutely necessary to expose the faults of pre-war German policy and to acknowledge responsibility in order to achieve a prosperous democracy and a retreat from militarism.

On 8 May 1919, a few days after the bloody repression of the Bavarian Soviet Republic, Heinrich Ströbel wrote in :

Carl von Ossietzky and Kurt Tucholsky, contributors to the review, supported the same point of view. On 23 July 1919, Tucholsky wrote a review of Emil Ludwig's book July 14: 

A pacifist movement was formed in the Weimar Republic, which demonstrated on 1 August, anti-war day. Its members came from different backgrounds: left-wing parties, liberal and anti-militarist groups, former soldiers, officers and generals. They took on the question of responsibility.

At the first pacifist congress in June 1919, when a minority led by Ludwig Quidde repudiated the Treaty of Versailles, the German League for Human Rights and the  made the question of responsibility a central theme. The independent Social Democrats and Eduard Bernstein were moving in the same direction and managed to change the representation put forward by the Social Democrats that war was a necessary condition for a successful social revolution. This led to the reunification of a minority of the party with the Social Democrats in 1924 and the inclusion of some pacifist demands in the 1925

Historians of the Sacred Union

Historians with minority views

Walter Fabian 

Walter Fabian, journalist and social-democratic politician, published Die Kriegsschuldfrage in 1925.  His book, although out of print a year after publication, was one of the books banned after Adolf Hitler came to power and examines the events that led to the war. The general opinion of German historians at the time was that responsibility for the outbreak was shared among various countries, of which Germany was only one, and that Germany had made no advance war preparations, certainly not for a long war. Fabian's book went against the general opinion, and acknowledged that Germany was largely to blame for the outbreak of war because of the attitude of its leading politicians.

Pre-war policy 

The system of alliances set up in the summer of 1914 and its complexity made the outbreak of war inevitable. Otto von Bismarck had recognized the usefulness of this policy at the time; Germany's central location in Europe pushed politicians like Bismarck to form alliances to avoid the nightmare scenario of possible encirclement. After having ensured the neutrality of Russia and Austria-Hungary in 1881 with the singing of the League of the Three Emperors, the Reinsurance Treaty was signed in 1887. The isolation of France was the basis of Bismarckian policy in order to be able to ensure the security of the Reich.

The July Crisis and mobilization 

The assassination of Archduke Franz Ferdinand of Austria served as a catalyst for war and "reflected the sharp tension that prevailed between Austria and Hungary for a number of years" The carte blanche given by William II to the Austrian emperor had, according to Fabian, also other reasons, in particular the willingness of Germany to wage a preventive war for fear of Russian mobilization.  In marginal notes on a report by German ambassador Heinrich von Tschirschky, William II wrote "The situation with the Serbs must be dealt with, and quickly. 
Walter Fabian judged the ultimatum addressed to Serbia to be impossible: "Austria wanted the ultimatum to be rejected; Germany, which according to Tirpitz already knew the main points of it on July 13, wanted the same thing."

Fabian showed that Germany had an undeniable share of responsibility in the war. Even if the emperor and chancellor Theobald von Bethmann Hollweg tried to defuse events at the last moment, the army threw its full weight into the effort in order to force the situation. Chief of Staff von Molkte sent a telegram in which he stated that Germany would mobilize, but William II asserted that there was no longer any reason to declare war since Serbia accepted the ultimatum. Various futile attempts at peace were made, such as the proposal of 27 July to hold a four-power conference.

Supremacy of the army 

"In Germany, too, only the military point of view was decisive."

The role of the army explains the mechanisms of the war guilt question. The roots of military supremacy are to be found in Prussia and in the system, established by Bismarck, in which Prussian militarism gained importance in the years after the unification of the Reich. As Helmuth von Moltke the Younger showed, in various wars such as the Franco-Prussian War of 1870, the Chief of the General Staff wielded great power.

When war broke out, the military staff intended to emerge victorious within six weeks, thanks to the Schlieffen Plan. Generals Hindenburg and Ludendorff, having come out of retirement, enjoyed great prestige. In 1916, Hindenburg was appointed Chief of Staff, and in 1917, a monumental statue was erected in Berlin in his honor. William II gradually lost his power, to the benefit of the two generals, who took the country in hand.
Ludendorff proposed the institution of a compulsory labor service to increase yields, which he believed to be insufficient. Bethmann Hollweg refused, but the Patriotic Auxiliary Service was established on 5 December 1917. 
On 13 July 1917, the Chancellor was forced to resign under pressure from the two generals,  on 14 July 1917.

At the opening of armistice negotiations, Germany was in the grip of revolutionary uprisings. A commission, presided over by Matthias Erzberger, was set up to sign the armistice treaty at Armistice Clearing in Compiègne. Instead of German military personnel carrying out the signing, civilian delegates, representing the Weimar Republic, which had been established nnly two days earlier, signed for Germany. As the generals refused to bear responsibility for the defeat, the general staff circulated an image of the republic as a symbol of defeat. This maneuver was all the more underhanded since Ludendorff had recognized the need for an armistice. Colonel Von Thaer also stated that on October 1, 1918, Ludendorff considered himself defeated.

Whereas military propaganda held the socialists responsible for the defeat, Fabian asserted that the defeat was due to the failure of possible peace initiatives. On 21 December 1916, President Woodrow Wilson made a peace proposal. It was refused by Germany, which did not want to hear about American mediation.
On January 31, 1917, Chancellor Bethmann Hollweg sent a secret note to Wilson to achieve peace. The German conditions were too high for this initiative to be considered a serious one. Moreover, it would have meant renouncing submarine warfare, which the army did not want under any circumstances since it represented the possibility of destroying 40% of British tonnage. 
The army did not want a peace in which Germany would be the loser. One goal of their submarine warfare was to pressure Great Britain into suing for peace and allowing Germany to set its own conditions. The only consequence would be the entry of the United States into the war.

Further evolution

Erfüllungspolitik 

Some politicians showed that the war guilt question was not an insurmountable obstacle. Chancellor Joseph Wirth put in place the policy of appeasement by executing the treaty between May 1921 and November 1922. This gave new impetus to diplomacy and improved the political and economic situation of the country. The Wirth government managed to obtain a revision of the treaty. The method used was simple: fulfill the clauses of the treaty in order to show their impossibility. The war reparations that Germany had to pay weighed heavily on the economy. It amounted to two billion Gold marks and 26% of its export revenue. By agreeing to pay this sum on 5 May 1921, Wirth demonstrated Germany's good faith. On 16 April 1922, the Treaty of Rapallo was signed, reducing Germany's isolation. However, the  became one of the foundations of the smear campaign led by the ultranationalists. Implementation of the treaty was considered treason, and one of the proponents of this policy, Walther Rathenau, was assassinated on 24 June 1922 in Berlin. Matthias Erzberger had been murdered a year earlier.

Gustav Stresemann 

By paving the way for other politicians, such as Gustav Stresemann, the  policy (policy of appeasement) allowed Germany to regain a leading European diplomatic position. After the 1922 Treaty of Rapallo, Germany renewed contacts with other countries, such as the Soviet Union. The borders that were defined by the Treaty of Versailles were also at the heart of the grievances of the German government, which requested their revision.

In October 1925, the Locarno Treaties were signed. They solved the problem of the borders, with Germany accepting the loss of Alsace-Lorraine and of Eupen-Malmedy, and in return Germany was assured that it would no longer be occupied by France. The war guilt question did not block its foreign policy. Stresemann, a man of compromise but above all a defender of German interests, succeeded in getting Germany to rejoin the League of Nations on 8 September 1926. If international relations were calmed, Franco-German relations were also calmed. Stresemann and Aristide Briand received the Nobel Peace Prize.

Decline of the Social Democrats 

The refusal to admit the collapse of the German army gave way to the stab-in-the-back myth, which alleged that the government formed by the socialists betrayed the army by signing the armistice while still in a state of combat. German nationalism, incarnated by the defeated military, did not recognize the legitimacy of the Weimar Republic. This legend weakened the Social Democratic Party through slander campaigns based on various allegations: namely, that the SDP not only betrayed the army and Germany by signing the armistice, but also repressed the Spartacist uprising, proclaimed the republic, and refused (for some of its members) to vote for war credits in 1914. Hindenburg spoke of the "division and relaxation of the will to victory" driven by internal party interests. Socialists are labeled, the "" ("the homeless"). Hindenburg continued to emphasize the innocence of the army, stating: "The good core of the Army is not to blame. Its performance is as admirable as that of the officer corps.

This slander had electoral consequences for the Social Democrats. In the 1920 election, the percentage of SPD seats in the Reichstag was 21.6 per cent, down from 38 per cent in 1919. Right-wing parties gradually gained ground, such as the German National People's Party (DNVP), which won 15.1 per cent of the seats compared to only 10.3 per cent in 1919. For five years, the SPD was absent from all governments between 30 November 1923 and 29 June 1928. According to Jean-Pierre Gougeon, the decline of the SPD was due to the fact that it had not sufficiently democratized the country since the proclamation of the Weimar Republic. Judges, civil servants and high-ranking civil servants had not been replaced, and they often remained loyal to the emperor, all the more so since military propaganda blamed the republic for his abdication.

Rise of the National Socialists 

Fabian foresaw the consequences that the war guilt question could have for the rise of extremism, which had been awakened in Germany as early as 1920 with the creation of the Nazi Party (NSDAP), which would make the Treaty of Versailles and the question of responsibility its trademark issue:
"But the war guilt question can also lead to the poisoning of relations between peoples, it can become a weapon forged for the hand of international nationalism."

The Working Committee of German Associations gave its support to Adolf Hitler as early as 1936, in particular through its president, Heinrich Schnee, for whom the "rescue of the fatherland" required "the joint action of all parties on national soil, including the NSDAP".

From the second point of the NSDAP's 25-point program, Adolf Hitler demanded that the German people be treated in the same way as other nations and demanded the abrogation of the Treaties of Versailles and of Saint-Germain-en-Laye. For him, "all German laws are nothing more than the anchoring of the peace treaties". Hitler took part in the war and was very much marked by the military collapse. Antisemitism also made its appearance as did attacks against personalities of Jewish origin, such as the one against Walther Rathenau or Maximilian Harden in 1922.
Hyperinflation due to reparations, the economic downturn after the 1929 stock market crash, and the resulting unemployment became campaign themes for NSDAP supporters.

The war guilt issue strengthened right-wing extremist movements and led to a radicalization of German society and eventually to the fall of the Weimar Republic.

National Socialism 

Adolf Hitler had asserted a war affirmation of all Germans in Mein Kampf in 1925:

Nevertheless, he saw the initiative for the world war on the side of the Entente, so that the German war guilt for him consisted in the failure of a preventive war:

After the Nazi seizure of power in 1933, a "Führer word" by Hitler ended the German war guilt debate following the previously propagated "war guilt lie" and in line with British historians of the appeasement era:

In other countries 

The public media battle didn't wait for the end of the war in countries involved in the war.
As their armies began to clash, the opposing governments engaged in a media battle attempting to avoid blame for causing the war, and casting blame on other countries, through the publication of carefully selected documents, basically consisting of diplomatic exchanges, selected and ordered to cast them in the best light possible. Sometimes, according to other combatants, they were misleading, or even falsified.

The German White Book appeared on 4 August 1914, and was the first such book to come out. It contains 36 documents. Within a week, most other combatant countries had published their own book, each named with a different color name.  France held off until 1 December 1914, when they finally published their Yellow Book.
Other combatants in the war published similar books: the Blue Book of Britain, the Orange Book of Russia, the Yellow Book of France, and the Austro-Hungarian Red Book, the Belgian Grey Book, and the Serbian Blue Book.

France 

France's government under Georges Clemenceau had insisted in 1919 on the contractual establishment of sole guilt on the part of Germany and Austria-Hungary. The payment of reparations for war damage incurred and the permanent weakening of the arch-enemy were the principal motives of this attitude, and were taken up by the public: '"The Krauts will pay for everything!"
This was perceived by the French public not only as a justification for reparations, but also as a demonstrative statement of political and moral guilt. The Socialists, too, saw only a partial responsibility on the part of the French in the war and also insisted on Germany's civil liability under Article 231 of the Treaty of Versailles.

When Germany was about to be admitted to the League of Nations in 1925, war guilt was again discussed in France. At that time, the French Yellow Book and the Senate Report were reissued. In contrast, Pierre Renouvin's 1925 book on the July Crisis, Origines immédiates de la guerre demonstrated forgeries in the Yellow Book, but received little attention.  Parallel to the German attempts to show documentary evidence of the innocence of the German Empire in the outbreak of war, the Documents Diplomatiques Français (1871-1914) were published by the French in three series from 1929 to 1959.

At the German Historians Conferences of the 1950s, German and French historians jointly advocated a version of Lloyd George's thesis that none of the governments involved had deliberately sought war. In his 1993 book, Mark B. Hayne advanced the thesis of substantial French complicity. In order to thwart the Schlieffen Plan, Poincaré and his associates had pushed for the quickest possible Russian mobilization. Stefan Schmidt came to a similar conclusion in 2009 in his research in the Paris archives. 
The Fischer debate triggered a self-critical view in France of French policy in the years after 1914.  criticized Fischer for considering German war aims in isolation from those of the other powers and for neglecting the interactions involved. 
He also put into perspective the importance of Bethmann Hollweg's Septemberprogramm, on which Fischer based his thesis of continuous German planning for hegemony. A counter position to this was held by Marc Ferro. Following Fischer, Ferro found the chief responsibility lay with Germany, but that the guilt was also on French and Russian sources, and secondarily with the Entente powers as well. Germany had the most pronounced desire to wage war.

Great Britain 

Until about 1955, the British debate on war guilt fluctuated between a determination of Germany's sole guilt and an equal share of war guilt, or innocence, of all the powers involved. The change in historical viewpoint was strongly influenced by current policies toward Germany.

In the summer of 1914, opinions on war guilt in Britain were in part critical of the government and pacifist, partly fatalist or Social Darwinist. After the German invasion of Belgium, Germany alone was considered to have caused the war, even by Prime Minister H. H. Asquith.
Thus Leonard Hobhouse, who only shortly earlier had accused the government of not having done enough to prevent the war, now pleaded for "national unity." Oxford historians also placed sole blame on Germany in 1914 and stressed that no propaganda was involved in taking an uncritical view of the Triple Entente's color books. William G. S. Adams, who saw the war as a "struggle of liberty against militarism," tried to prove that Germany had deliberately risked a "European conflagration" in order to force England to honor its "moral obligations" to France and Belgium.

Analogous to the German document collections, eleven volumes of British Documents on the Origin of the war 1898-1914 were published in Britain from 1926 to 1938.

Germany's welcome entry into the League of Nations then triggered a turnaround. Now, British historians such as Paul Kennedy, Michael Howard, and Jonathan Steinberg took into account hitherto neglected economic, social-historical, and military-historical aspects as well as the role of Austria-Hungary. John Gooch, in Recent Revelations of European Diplomacy, denied that "anyone wanted the war at all." William H. Dawson, who shortly before had seen "German militarism" as the sole cause of the war, now singled out the Alliance system as the culprit. Raymond Beazley wrote as late as 1933:

British historians mostly agreed with Fischer's main theses, but subsequently began a nuanced and critical examination of Britain's own responsibility for the First World War. For example, James Joll wrote the following in the introduction to Germany's Aims in the First World War, Carlisle A. Macartney's translation of Fischer's :

In 1999, the Scottish historian Niall Ferguson argued in his book The Pity of War that the world war was avoidable with the crisis management available to European diplomacy at the time, and that only Britain's entry into the war escalated it to a pan-European war. The arms race in fleet construction was exacerbated by several things, including the 1905 British decision to build large battleships, a 1911 meeting of British generals, admirals, and government, and a lack of British willingness to negotiate.

As soon as Germany was no longer considered its number one military and economic competitor, British policy sought alliances with France and Russia. The British maneuvering first created illusions of British neutrality on the German side, then fears of encirclement, and thus strengthened Germany's readiness for war. Britain's alliance policy had forced Germany to go to war after the Russian general mobilization.
He denied a significant role of militarism and imperialism as a factor, as well as any significant opposition of colonial interests between Germany and Great Britain.

However, these theses were mostly rejected despite praise for their economic analyses. Thomas Kühne called Ferguson a historical revisionist.

Military historian John Keegan also saw World War I in 1999 as caused not by deliberate action on the part of the powers but by the fatal automatism of the alliances:

Like Keith M. Wilson and Michael Brock, Keegan doubted Germany Germany's primary culpability in the outbreak of war. These historians point to a willingness of the British public to intervene, and the rather confrontational policies of the Foreign Office.

According to John Leslie, the real authors of the war were not to be sought solely in Berlin, as the Fritz Fischer school had always maintained, but also in Vienna. In his view, a group of "hawks" in the Austrian Foreign Ministry had unleashed the war. The Scottish military historian Hew Strachan emphasizes the economic competition between Germany and England, Germany's isolation in foreign policy, and what he sees as a disastrous effect of the policy of alliances:

According to Paul W. Schroeder, the German fears of encirclement in 1914 were based on reality and resulted from a lack of willingness on the part of Germany and Austria-Hungary to carry out social and political reforms:

Australian historian Christopher Clark also disagreed in his 2012 study The Sleepwalkers.

Soviet Union

United States 

Academic work in the English-speaking world in the later 1920s and 1930s, blamed the participants more or less equally. In the early 1920s, several American historians opposed to the terms of the Treaty of Versailles such as Sidney Bradshaw Fay, Charles A. Beard and Harry Elmer Barnes produced works that claimed that Germany was not responsible for war. Article 231 of the Treaty of Versailles, which had seemingly assigned all responsibility for the war to Germany and thus justified the Allied claim to reparations, was invalid. A feature of American "revisionist" historians of the 1920s was a tendency to treat Germany as a victim of the war and the Allies as the aggressors. The objective of Fay and Barnes was to put an end to reparations imposed on Germany, by attempting to prove what they regarded as the moral invalidity of Article 231. The exiled Wilhelm praised Barnes upon meeting him in 1926. According to Barnes, Wilhelm "was happy to know that I did not blame him for starting the war in 1914. He disagreed with my view that Russia and France were chiefly responsible. He held that the villains of 1914 were the international Jews and Free Masons who, he alleged, desired to destroy national states and the Christian religion."

The German Foreign Ministry lavished special "care" upon the efforts of both Fay and Barnes with generous use of the German archives, and in the case of Barnes, research funds provided by the German government. The German government liked Fay's The Origin of the War so much that it purchased hundreds of copies in various languages to hand out for free at German embassies and consulates. The German government allowed books that were pro-German in their interpretation, such as Barnes's The Genesis of the World War, to be translated into German while books such as Bernadotte Schmitt's The Coming of War 1914 that were critical of German actions in 1914, were not permitted to be published in Germany.

Austria 

For Emperor Franz Joseph I, the responsibilities for military action against Serbia were clear at the end of July 1914: "The machinations of a hateful adversary compel Me, in order to preserve the honor of My Monarchy and to protect its position of power ... to take up the sword." However, the Serbian government had sent Vienna a warning in the run-up to the Sarajevo attack, which was not taken seriously.

"We started the war, not the Germans and even less the Entente," was the assessment of Leopold Andrian, a former diplomat of the Danube Monarchy, shortly after the war. It had been "about the existence of the fatherland".

Chancellor Karl Renner, who headed the Austrian negotiating delegation to St. Germain in 1919, took a similar view: The delegation made a confession of war guilt.

German historian and expert on the July Crisis Annika Mombauer agrees with this, but also sees Germany as responsible: "...the main part of the responsibility for the outbreak of the war must still be situated in the decisions of Austria-Hungary and Germany".

Post-World War II

West Germany 
After the fall of the Nazi regime, conservative historians from the time of the Weimar Republic dominated the debates in West Germany by spreading the same theses as before.
For example, Gerhard Ritter wrote that "A politico-military situation held our diplomacy prisoner at the time of the great world crisis of July 1914."

In , Friedrich Meinecke supports the same idea. Foreign research, such as that of the Italian Luigi Albertini, is not taken into account. In his three-volume critical work, published in 1942-1943, Albertini comes to the conclusion that all European governments had a share of responsibility in the outbreak of the war, while pointing to German pressure on Austria-Hungary as the decisive factor in the latter's bellicose behaviour in Serbia.

In September 1949, Ritter, who became the first president of the  stated in his opening statement that the fight against the war guilt question at the time of the Weimar Republic finally led to the worldwide success of German theses, which he still maintained in his 1950 essay: "The German thesis that there could be no question of a long-prepared invasion of their neighbours by the Central Powers soon became generalized within the huge international specialist research community."

Fischer controversy 

The Hamburg historian Fritz Fischer was the first to research all accessible archive holdings according to the war aims of the Central Powers before and during the war.

Fischer's book Germany's Aims in the First World War drew conclusions from detailed analysis of the long-term causes of war and their connection the foreign and German colonial policy of Kaiser Wilhelm II.

Initially, right-wing conservative authors such as Giselher Wirsing accused Fischer of pseudo-history and, like , tried to uphold the Supreme Army Command's hypothesis of Russian war guilt. Imanuel Geiss supported Fischer in 1963–64 with a two-volume collection of documents, referring in it to the destruction of important files from the July crisis in Berlin shortly after the war.

After a battle of speeches lasting several hours at the 1964 Historians' Day, Fischer's main rival Andreas Hillgruber conceded considerable responsibility of the German leadership under Chancellor Bethmann Hollweg for the outbreak of the war, but continued to deny the Empire's continuous striving for hegemony before and during the war. Gerhard Ritter stuck to his view of a foreign policy "encirclement" of Germany by the Entente powers, which in his view, had rendered any German striving for hegemony as purely illusory adventurism.

German-American historian  noted, when Fischer published his findings in 1961, that Fischer instantly rendered obsolete every book previously published on the subject of responsibility for the First World War, and German aims in that war. Fischer's own position on German responsibility for World War I has become known as the "Fischer thesis."

Since around 1970, Fischer's work has stimulated increased research into the socio-economic causes of war. These include the orientation toward a war economy, the imperial monarchy's inability to reform domestic policy, and domestic competition over resources.

Contemporary research 

Since German reunification in 1990, archives from the former GDR and the Soviet Union have also been evaluated. Prompted by Fischer's theses, researchers increasingly devoted themselves to German policy in the states occupied by the Kaiserreich. Wolfgang J. Mommsen presented concrete plans for the forced expulsion and resettlement of Poles and Jews and, in 1981, blamed government action on the nationalism of important interest groups. Wolfgang Steglich, on the other hand, used foreign archival material to emphasize German-Austrian efforts to achieve an amicable or separate peace since 1915, and lack of crisis management by Germany's opponents.

Thomas Nipperdey contradicted sociohistorical explanations in 1991 with his view that the "war, the German readiness for war and the crisis policy" were not a consequence of the German social system. He modified Lloyd George's "slide into war" thesis and referred to disastrous military plans and war decisions of the executive even in parliamentary states.

2013 saw the publication of Christopher Clark's The Sleepwalkers: How Europe Went to War in 1914, and Herfried Münkler, two works that disputed whether Germany contributed any more to the outbreak of the Great War in 1914 through its actions or inactions than the other great powers did. Since their appearance, the debate has once again been considered open, according to some scholars.

More recent publications by and large stick to the earlier view, namely that Germany contributed significantly to the fact "that as the crisis widened, alternative strategies for de-escalation did not bear fruit ... Given Germany's policy until 23 July to exert pressure on the Viennese government to take advantage of the situation and to deal with the Serbs, Germany undoubtedly did have a special responsibility".
 the Central Powers bearing primary responsibility for the outbreak of the war, even if it could not be blamed on them alone.

The public debate on longer-term causes of the war continues. Today, it relates primarily to the following topics:
 the question of political room for maneuver, or the inevitability of rearmament and the policy of alliances before the war. With this question, the earlier classification of the era as imperialist became more varied and nuanced. In most cases, the common culpability of all European hegemonic powers is highlighted, without diminishing the triggering moves by Germany and Austria.
 the role of domestic politics, social tensions, and economic interests in the escalation of foreign policy among all participating states
 the role of mob mentality and war experiences and their interaction with war propaganda. This is addressed in the Bruno Thoss essay.
 the role of military leaders and military interests that scuttled efforts to de-escalate and to negotiate a peace.
 the question of a possible German Sonderweg into the 20th century
 the question of influential factors that possibly made the First World War the necessary conditions and preparatory groundwork for the Second World War and its crimes and significantly contributed to the outbreak and course of the Second World War: Thus, many speak of the "Great seminal catastrophe of the 20th century"; Raymond Aron sees both world wars as a new "Thirty Years' War".

Anne Lipp's  (Shaping Opinion in War) analyzed how soldiers, military leaders, and wartime propaganda reacted to the front-line experience of mass destruction. Attempts had been made to refute doubts about the defensive character of the war by placing it in an aggressive-nationalist context.  offered front-line soldiers heroic images for identification, in order to redirect their horror, and their fears of death and defeat into the opposite of what they had experienced. To the "homeland," the "front-line fighters" were held up as role models to prevent insubordination, desertion, public agitation against a war of conquest, and maintaining solidarity of soldiers and civilians against it. This had created a persistent, mass mentality that set the course for the postwar success of war-glorifying myths such as the stab-in-the-back myth.

In 2002, the historians  and  emphasized the opportunities for détente between the major European powers that had existed until the assassination in Sarajevo which had not been exploited. Other historians disagreed: in 2003, Volker Berghahn argued that the structural causes of the war, which went beyond individual government decisions, could be found in the alliance system of the European great powers and their gradual formation of blocs. Like Fischer and others, he too saw the naval arms race and competition in the conquest of colonies as major factors by which all of Europe's great powers contributed to the outbreak of war, albeit with differences in degree. He also considered domestic minority conflicts in multinational Austria. Nevertheless, he named the small leadership circles, especially in Berlin and Vienna, as the main culprits for the fact that the July crisis of 1914 led to war. The decision makers had shown a high willingness to take risks and at the same time had aggravated the crisis with mismanagement and miscalculations, until the only solution seemed to them to be the "flight forward" into war with the other great powers.

See also 

 Article 231 of the Treaty of Versailles
 Austria victim theory
 Causes of World War I
 American entry into World War I
 Austro-Hungarian entry into World War I
 British entry into World War I
 French entry into World War I
 German entry into World War I
 Italian entry into World War I
 Japanese entry into World War I
 Ottoman entry into World War I
 Russian entry into World War I
 History of the Balkans
 Paris Peace Conference, 1919
 Centre for the Study of the Causes of the War
 Commission of Responsibilities
 European Civil War
 German collective guilt
 Germany's Aims in the First World War
 Historiography of Germany
 Harry Elmer Barnes
 Hermann Lutz
 Max Montgelas
 Pierre Renouvin
 Historiography of the causes of World War I
 International relations (1814–1919)
 International relations (1919–1939)
 Manifesto of the Ninety-Three
 Paris Peace Conference (1919–1920)
 Propaganda in World War I
 "War of Illusions"
 World War I reparations

References

Notes 

Footnotes

Cited sources 

 

 

 

 

 

 

 

 

 

 

  translated from:

Uncited sources

Sources

Pre-WW I events 

 Jacques Benoist-Méchin, Histoire de l'Armée allemande, Robert Laffont, Paris, 1984. (in French)
 Volker Berghahn, Der Erste Weltkrieg (Wissen in der Beck´schen Reihe). C.H. Beck, München 2003,  (in German)
 Jean-Pierre Cartier, Der Erste Weltkrieg, Piper, München 1984.  (in German)
 , Les Causes de la Première Guerre mondiale. Essai d'historiographie, Paris, 1997. (in French)
 Niall Ferguson, Der falsche Krieg; DVA, Stuttgart 1999,  (in German)
 . 
 
 Imanuel Geiss, Der lange Weg in die Katastrophe, Die Vorgeschichte des Ersten Weltkrieges 1815–1914, Piper, München 1990,  (in German)
 James Joll, Gordon Martel: The Origins of the First World War Longman 2006,  (in English)
 Paul M. Kennedy, The Rise of the Anglo-German Antagonism 1860–1914; Allen & Unwin, London 1980,  (in English)
 Robert K. Massie, Die Schalen des Zorns. Großbritannien, Deutschland und das Heraufziehen des Ersten Weltkrieges, Frankfurt/Main (S. Fischer) 1993,  (in German)
 Wolfgang J. Mommsen, Die Urkatastrophe Deutschlands. Der Erste Weltkrieg 1914–1918 (= Handbuch der deutschen Geschichte 17). Klett-Cotta, Stuttgart 2002,  (in German)
 Sönke Neitzel, Kriegsausbruch. Deutschlands Weg in die Katastrophe 1900-1914, München 2002,  (in German)
 Pierre Renouvin, Les Buts de guerre du gouvernement français. 1914-1915, in Revue historique 1966
 Pierre Renouvin, Les Origines immédiates de la guerre, Paris, 1925
 Pierre Renouvin, La Crise européenne et la Grande Guerre, Paris, 1939
 Gerhard Ritter, Staatskunst und Kriegshandwerk. Band 3: Die Tragödie der Staatskunst München, 1964 (in German)
 Volker Ullrich, Die nervöse Großmacht. Aufstieg und Untergang des deutschen Kaiserreichs 1871–1918, Frankfurt/Main (S. Fischer) 1997,  (in German)

Contemporary publications from the Weimar Republic 

 
 Camille Bloch/Pierre Renouvin, « L'article 231 du traité de Versailles. Sa genèse et sa signification », in Revue d'Histoire de la Guerre mondiale, janvier 1932
 
 Hajo Holborn, Kriegsschuld und Reparationen auf der Pariser Friedenskonferenz von 1919, B. G. Teubner, Leipzig/Berlin 1932 (in German)
 Heinrich Kanner, Der Schlüssel zur Kriegsschuldfrage, München 1926 (in German)
 Max Graf Montgelas, Leitfaden zur Kriegsschuldfrage, W. de Gruyter & co. Berlin/Leipzig 1923 (in German)
 :fr:Mathias Morhardt, Die wahren Schuldigen. Die Beweise, das Verbrechen des gemeinen Rechts, das diplomatische Verbrechen, Leipzig 1925 (in German)
 Raymond Poincaré/René Gerin, Les Responsabilités de la guerre. Quatorze questions par René Gerin. Quatorze réponses par Raymond Poincaré., Payot, Paris, 1930
 Heinrich Ströbel, Der alte Wahn, dans : Weltbühne 8 mai 1919 (in German)
 Max Weber,Zum Thema der „Kriegsschuld", 1919; Zur Untersuchung der Schuldfrage, 1919 (in German)

Debate descriptions 

 Fritz Dickmann, Die Kriegsschuldfrage auf der Friedenskonferenz von Paris 1919, München 1964 (Beiträge zur europäischen Geschichte 3) (in German)
 Michael Dreyer, Oliver Lembcke, Die deutsche Diskussion um die Kriegsschuldfrage 1918/19, Duncker & Humblot GmbH (1993),  (in German)
 Jacques Droz, L'Allemagne est-elle responsable de la Première Guerre mondiale ?, in L'Histoire, 72, November 1984
 Sidney B. Fay, The Origins of the World War, 2 Bände, New York 1929 (in English)
 Hermann Kantorowicz, Imanuel Geiss, Gutachten zur Kriegsschuldfrage 1914, Europäische Verlagsanstalt 1967, ASIN B0000BRV2R (in German)
  
 
 Georges-Henri Soutou, L'Or et le Sang. Les Buts de guerre économiques de la Première Guerre mondiale, Fayard, Paris, 1989

Fischer Controversy 

 Volker Berghahn, "Die Fischer-Kontroverse - 15 Jahre danach", in: Geschichte und Gesellschaft 6 (1980), pp. 403–419. (in German)
 .
 Klaus Große Kracht, Die zankende Zunft. Historische Kontroversen in Deutschland nach 1945, Vandenhoeck & Ruprecht, Göttingen 2005,  (Recension de Manfred Kittel, Institut für Zeitgeschichte, München-Berlin) (in German)
 Wolfgang Jäger, Historische Forschung und politische Kultur in Deutschland. Die Debatte 1914–1980 über den Ausbruch des Ersten Weltkrieges, Göttingen 1984. (in German)
 Konrad H. Jarausch, Der nationale Tabubruch. Wissenschaft, Öffentlichkeit und Politik in der Fischer-Kontroverse, dans : Martin Sabrow, Ralph Jessen, Klaus Große Kracht (Hrsg.): Zeitgeschichte als Streitgeschichte. Große Kontroversen seit 1945, Beck 2003,  (in German)
 John Anthony Moses, The Politics of Illusion. The Fischer Controversy in German Historiography, London 1975 (Nachdruck 1985),  (in English)
 Gregor Schöllgen, Griff nach der Weltmacht? 25 Jahre Fischer-Kontroverse, dans : Historisches Jahrbuch 106 (1986), pp. 386–406. (in German)
 Matthew Stibbe, The Fischer Controversy over German War Aims in the First World War and its Reception by East German Historians, 1961–1989. Dans : The Historical Journal 46/2003, pp. 649–668. (in English)

Recent analyses 
 .
  
 Stig Förster (dir.), An der Schwelle zum Totalen Krieg. Die militärische Debatte über den Krieg der Zukunft 1919–1939 (= Krieg in der Geschichte 13). Ferdinand Schöningh Verlag, Paderborn 2002,  (in German)
 Jürgen Förster, Geistige Kriegführung in Deutschland 1919-1945 (in German)
 David Fromkin et William-Oliver Desmond, Le Dernier Été de l'Europe : Qui a déclenché la Première Guerre mondiale ?, Paris, 2004 
 Christoph Gnau, Die deutschen Eliten und der Zweite Weltkrieg, PapyRossa-Verlag, Köln 2007,  (in German)
 
 
 Markus Pöhlmann, Kriegsgeschichte und Geschichtspolitik: Der Erste Weltkrieg. Die amtliche Militärgeschichtsschreibung 1914–1956 (= Krieg in der Geschichte 12). Ferdinand Schöningh Verlag, Paderborn 2002,  (in German)
 Jörg Richter, Kriegsschuld und Nationalstolz. Politik zwischen Mythos und Realität, Katzmann, 2003 (in German)
 Bruno Thoß et Hans-Erich Volkmann (dir.), Erster Weltkrieg – Zweiter Weltkrieg: Ein Vergleich. Krieg, Kriegserlebnis, Kriegserfahrung in Deutschland. Ferdinand Schöningh Verlag, Paderborn 2002,  (in German)

Other aspects 
 Gerhard Besier, Krieg - Frieden - Abrüstung. Die Haltung der europäischen und amerikanischen Kirchen zur Frage der deutschen Kriegsschuld 1914-1933, Göttingen 1982 (in German)
 Britta Bley, Wieviel Schuld verträgt ein Land? CD-ROM, Fachverlag für Kulturgeschichte und deren Vermittlung, Bielefeld 2005,  (in German)

Further reading 

 Jörg Richter, Kriegsschuld und Nationalstolz. Politik zwischen Mythos und Realität, Katzmann, 2003
 Mombauer, Annika. "Guilt or Responsibility? The Hundred-Year Debate on the Origins of World War I." Central European History 48.4 (2015): 541–564.

 

Aftermath of World War I in Germany
 
Guilt
Historiography of World War I
Politics of World War I
Weimar Republic
World War I propaganda